The United States Department of Defense's Foreign Military Sales (FMS) program facilitates sales of U.S. arms, defense equipment, defense services, and military training to foreign governments. The purchaser does not deal directly with the defense contractor; instead, the Defense Security Cooperation Agency (DSCA) serves as an intermediary, usually handling procurement, logistics, and delivery, often providing product support, training, and infrastructure construction (such as hangars, runways, utilities, etc.).

FMS is carried out with countries that are authorized to participate and is subject to approval based on the mechanism to procure services, a deposit in a U.S. trust fund or appropriate credit, and approval to fund services. On any given day, DSCA is managing “14,000 open foreign military sales cases with 185 countries,” the DSCA director Lieutenant General Charles Hooper explained at the Brookings Institution in June 2019. 

Some U.S. Air Force (USAF) FMS programs are assigned two-word code names beginning with the word PEACE, indicating oversight by USAF headquarters. The second word in these codenames is often chosen to reflect some facet of the customer. Codenames appear in all capital letters.

In fiscal 2020, U.S. military-industry sold $50.8 billion via FMS and $124.3 billion via direct commercial sales (DCS).

The Defense Security Cooperation Agency emphasizes that FMS is "a fundamental tool of U.S. foreign policy."

See also
 Foreign Military Sales Act of 1968
 Foreign Military Sales Act of 1971
 List of F-16 FMS programs
 United States Foreign Military Financing

References

 Department of Defense Financial Management Regulation (DoDFMR) 7000.14-R, Volume 15

External links
 DSCA Foreign Military Sales program page
 AFSAC  - The Air Force Security Assistance Center

 
Military industry